Ezekiel 21 is the twenty-first chapter of the Book of Ezekiel in the Hebrew Bible or the Old Testament of the Christian Bible. This book contains the prophecies attributed to the prophet/priest Ezekiel, and is one of the Books of the Prophets. In chapters 20 to 24 there are "further predictions regarding the fall of Jerusalem", and this chapter also includes a prophecy against the Ammonites.

Text
The original text of this chapter is written in the Hebrew language. This chapter is divided into 32 verses.

Textual witnesses
Some early manuscripts containing the text of this chapter in Hebrew are of the Masoretic Text tradition, which includes the Codex Cairensis (895), the Petersburg Codex of the Prophets (916), Aleppo Codex (10th century), Codex Leningradensis (1008).

There is also a translation into Greek known as the Septuagint, made in the last few centuries BC. Extant ancient manuscripts of the Septuagint version include Codex Vaticanus (B; B; 4th century), Codex Alexandrinus (A; A; 5th century) and Codex Marchalianus (Q; Q; 6th century).

Verses 6-7a
Sigh therefore, son of man, with a breaking heart, and sigh with bitterness before their eyes. And it shall be when they say to you, ‘Why are you sighing?’ that you shall answer, ‘Because of the news; when it comes, every heart will melt, all hands will be feeble, every spirit will faint, and all knees will be weak as water.

Verse 9
 Son of man, prophesy and say, ‘Thus says the Lord!’ Say:
 ‘A sword, a sword is sharpened
 And also polished!’ (NKJV)
 "Son of man" (Hebrew: בן־אדם ben adam): this phrase is used 93 times to address Ezekiel, including seven times in this chapter.
 "Sword": it is first "polished" then "engaged."

Verses 19b-20
Make a sign; put it at the head of the road to the city. Appoint a road for the sword to go to Rabbah, [capital] of the Ammonites, and to Judah, into fortified Jerusalem.
The signpost represented the decision then faced by Nebuchadrezzar, king of Babylon, regarding which of these two capitals to attack.

Verse 21
For the king of Babylon stands at the parting of the road, at the fork of the two roads, to use divination: he shakes the arrows, he consults the images, he looks at the liver.
Three methods of divination are noted: Biblical scholar Julie Galambush comments that "the arrows apparently functioned like lots, first labelled and then shaken together in a quiver, after which one was drawn out"; teraphim (images) were also used in Canaan and Israel (see ,  and ); hepatoscopy, divination based on the analysis of sheep livers, was widespread in the ancient Near East.

See also

 Ammonites
 Babylon
 Israel
 Jerusalem
 Judah
 Rabbah
Related Bible parts: Ezekiel 18, Hebrews 12

Notes

References

Bibliography

External links

Jewish
Ezekiel 21 Hebrew with Parallel English
Ezekiel 21 Hebrew with Rashi's Commentary

Christian
Ezekiel 21 English Translation with Parallel Latin Vulgate

21